Rumen Yordanov Petkov (born 23 June 1961) is a Bulgarian politician.

Biography 

Prior to turning to politics, Petkov received an education in mathematics, studying the subject at the mathematics high school in Pleven and Plovdiv University.

He served as mayor of Pleven between 1995 and 1999. Petkov was a member of the Bulgarian Socialist Party until 7 March 2014, but is currently affiliated with ABV.

Between August 2005 and April 2008, Petkov held the position of Minister of the Interior.

Petkov is married to Galina Ilieva Petkova and they have two sons named Bogdan and Philip.

References 

Bulgarian Socialist Party politicians
Members of the National Assembly (Bulgaria)
Government ministers of Bulgaria
1961 births
Living people
People from Pleven